The speckled tinkerbird (Pogoniulus scolopaceus) is a species of bird in the Lybiidae family (African barbets).

It is found in Angola, Benin, Cameroon, Central African Republic, Republic of the Congo, Democratic Republic of the Congo, Ivory Coast, Equatorial Guinea, Gabon, Ghana, Guinea, Kenya, Liberia, Nigeria, Sierra Leone, Togo, and Uganda.

References

speckled tinkerbird
Birds of Sub-Saharan Africa
Birds of the Gulf of Guinea
Birds of Central Africa
Birds of West Africa
speckled tinkerbird
speckled tinkerbird
Taxonomy articles created by Polbot